The 2007 Batasang Pambansa bombing occurred on the night of November 13, 2007, at the Batasang Pambansa Complex (National Assembly Complex) in Quezon City, Philippines. The blast killed Congressman Wahab Akbar and Marcial Taldo, a staff member of Congresswoman Luzviminda Ilagan, and wounded Ilagan, Congressman Pryde Henry Teves, and two others.

Explosion
The legislative session had just ended, and lawmakers were leaving the building when the blast occurred at 8:15 p.m. at the south wing of the building. Witnesses reported that "the ground shook and parts of the ceiling collapsed and chunks of the facade were dislodged." Marcial Taldo, driver of Gabriela party-list Rep. Luzviminda Ilagan, died on the spot in Ilagan's car. Basilan Representative Wahab Akbar, the apparent target of the blast, was rushed to the Far Eastern University hospital in Quezon City where he was later declared dead. Police believe the explosive device was planted in a nearby motorcycle.

Four other people were killed or later died from their injuries, and 12 were injured, including Ilagan and Congressman Pryde Henry Teves of Negros Oriental. Both Congressman Teves' eardrums were severely damaged, apparently disabling his hearing. An earlier report stated that his leg would require amputation, but was later revoked upon the doctor's decision that medical intervention short of amputation could be implemented to rehabilitate the wounded legislator's leg.

Immediately after the blast, lawmakers were not allowed to leave the building.

Casualties

Fatalities
Congressman Wahab Akbar, Representative of the lone district of Basilan
Junaskiri Hayudini, an aide of Rep. Akbar
Marcial Taldo, a staff member of Congresswoman Luzviminda Ilagan of the GABRIELA Women's Party party-list
Maan Gale Bustaliño, the Chief of Staff of Rep. Pryde Henry Teves
Dennis Manila, aide of Rep. Teves
Vercita Garcia, staff member of Rep. Pryde Henry Teves died at 6:30 p.m. because of cardiac arrest at St. Luke's Medical Center in Quezon, City on December 17, 2007

Injuries
Congressman Pryde Henry Teves, legislator for the 3rd district of Negros Oriental. On December 18, 2007, Teves was moved out of the intensive care unit of St. Luke’s Medical Center in Quezon City to a private room, and recuperated from fractured leg and sustained deep burns in his arms from the bombing. On January 31, 2008, Teves reported for work at the House of Representatives, against doctors' advice. Teves, still in a wheelchair, wore black cotton gloves to protect his burned hands, and could not shake hands or use his cellular phone.
Congresswoman Luzviminda Ilagan, legislator for the GABRIELA Women's Party party-list.

Investigation
Philippine National Police Director General Avelino Razon was ordered by President Gloria Macapagal Arroyo to personally supervise the investigation of the explosion.

The Philippine National Police (PNP) said in an interview that they had raided a house not far from the Congress Building. The occupants of the house started to shoot at them; consequently, the police killed three people, who were said to be suspected members of the terrorist group Abu Sayyaf. The following was confiscated in the house: A dozen stickers bearing the logo of the Philippine Congress, a car plate with a number 8 (which is for Congressmen), an Identification Card from the House of Representatives, and the plate number which was suspected to have been removed from the motorcycle that was used to hide the bomb.

The police arrested three suspects Caidar Aunal, Adham Kusain, and Ikram Indama and subsequent police interrogation disclosed "damning evidence" against the slain representative's political rivals, former Deputy House Speaker Gerry Salapuddin and Anak Mindanao Party-List Rep. Mujiv Hataman, citing the trail of events and mechanisms involved in the planning of the attack, and as such, police said charges would be filed by government prosecutors against the slain Basilan congressman's political rivals.  The two political figures appeared beforehand at the National Police headquarters with the desire to clear their names of involvement in the attack.  Subsequent action by government prosecutors made Salapuddin and Hataman, together with the latter's brother Benjamin "Jim" Hataman, suspects/masterminds in the bombing.

Arrest

On December 14, 2007, in 2-page resolution, the Supreme Court of the Philippines issued a writ of habeas corpus on petition of suspects Caidar Aunal, Adham Kusain, and Ikram Indama. It required the Philippine National Police’s (PNP) Criminal Investigation and Detection Group (CIDG), National Capital Region-Criminal Investigation and Detection Unit (NCR-CIDU) and the PNP Custodial Center to file returns before Quezon City Regional Trial Court Executive Judge Romeo Zamora on December 18.

On December 20, 2007, the criminal case Q-07-149982 filed against accused Caidar Aunal, Adham Kusain, and Ikram Indama was raffled to the sala of Regional Trial Court branch 83 Judge Ralph Lee after Branch 80 judge Charito Gonzales recused herself. On January 29, 2008, Judge Ralph Lee granted the three accused's motion for preliminary investigation, ordered the DOJ to issue resolution within 20 days, and the arraignment was set on February 26. The Judge also directed the Criminal Investigation and Detection Group (CIDG) to transfer all accused to the Quezon City Jail. On April 28, 2008, Judge Lee issued the warrant and ordered the arrest of former Basilan Representative Gerry Salapuddin, Police Officer 1 Bayan Judda, Jaharun Jamiri and Benjamin Hataman, all indicted with multiple murder and multiple frustrated murder cases before the court.

Jamiri Hajirun y Usman, ex- mayor of Tuburan, Basilan was indicted for violation of Section 2 of Republic Act 8294 (Illegal possession of explosives) before Manila RTC, on May 15, 2008, and P200,000 bail was recommended for his release.

See also 

 List of attacks on legislatures

References

External links
 Abs-Cbn, Batasan blast archives, photos and videos

2007 in the Philippines
November 2007 events in the Philippines
2007 murders in the Philippines
Quezon City
Crime in Metro Manila
Building bombings in the Philippines
Murder in the Philippines
Mass murder in 2007
Attacks on legislatures
Presidency of Gloria Macapagal Arroyo